Episcopal Day School (EDS) is an independent, co-educational school in Pensacola, Florida, providing courses from pre-kindergarten to grade 8 levels. The roots of Episcopal Day School date back to 1856 when an educational ministry was founded as a part of Old Christ Church. The school in its current form has operated since 1952. While founded on Episcopal traditions, EDS is welcoming of all faiths and backgrounds.

The core curriculum focuses on Reading/Literature, Writing, Math, Science, Social Studies, and Spanish. Additional enrichment classes include Library, Technology, Robotics, Physical Education, Christian Education, and the Arts. Christian education is taught as an enrichment class and the students attend chapel every Wednesday.

Chapel
Every Wednesday, grades PreK-2 through eighth grade and their teachers gather for chapel by walking across the street to Christ Church parish. Students help run the service by doing various parts. The fourth grade makes up the choir that sings hymns, the sixth and seventh grades do the readings from the book of Episcopal Book of Common Prayer and stories from the Bible. The eighth grade makes up the Acolyte team which leads the Priests and Choir down the aisle at the beginning and end of the service. PreK-2 through first grade has its own chapel. Second grade through eighth grade with their teachers attend chapel services throughout the school year.

Curriculum
The core curriculum at EDS focuses on comprehensive instruction in the subject areas of Reading/Literature, Writing, Math, Science, Social Studies, and Spanish. Additional enrichment classes include Library, Technology, Robotics, Physical Education, Christian Education, and the Arts. There is a deep commitment to 21st Century Teaching and Learning with InFocus boards in every Pre3 classroom, mobile learning devices, and a 1:1 technology program that allows students immediate access to online resources. Students have access to school-provided MacBook Air computers and iPads that are located on mobile laptop carts throughout the school.

Faculty and staff
There are approximately 60 members of the faculty and staff, with 8 members on the administration.

Grades
There are three programs offered at EDS: preschool, lower school, and middle school. Preschool offers PreK-2 through Prek-4, while Lower school offers Kindergarten through 4th grade. The middle school consists of 5th through 8th grade.

Uniforms
All students of EDS are required to wear uniforms. For shirts, there are choices between white, red, and gray polos. Shirts must be monogrammed. Boys may wear khaki pants or shorts. Girls may wear a khaki or plaid skirt, khaki pants or shorts, or a jumper. A separate uniform is worn on chapel day and on field trips.

Sports
There are sports in which students can participate. These sports include basketball, volleyball, football, tennis, track, and swimming.  Volleyball is offered for only the fifth, sixth, seventh, and eighth grades. Basketball begins in the fourth grade and continues to the eighth.

Accreditation
Episcopal Day School is accredited by the Southern Association of Independent Schools (SAIS,) and the Florida Council of Independent Schools (FCIS).

References

External links
School Website

Episcopal schools in the United States
Private middle schools in Florida
Private elementary schools in Florida